Erkka Petäjä (born 13 February 1964) is a Finnish former international footballer who earned 84 caps at international level between 1983 and 1994. Petäjä, who played as a defender, played professionally in Finland, Sweden and Switzerland for TPS, Östers IF, Helsingborgs IF, Malmö FF, Yverdon-Sport, Husqvarna FF and Inter Turku.

References

1964 births
Living people
Finnish footballers
Finland international footballers
Finnish expatriate footballers
Allsvenskan players
Östers IF players
Malmö FF players
Helsingborgs IF players
Yverdon-Sport FC players
FC Inter Turku players
Husqvarna FF players
Expatriate footballers in Switzerland
Expatriate footballers in Sweden
Association football defenders
Footballers from Turku